Malcolm Farr (born 2 August 1951 ) is a political journalist in the Canberra Press Gallery covering the Parliament of Australia in Canberra, Australia.

Work
Based in Canberra, Farr is the National Political Editor for News.com.au and contributing writer to The Punch

He has worked for a number of Australian publications including The Daily Telegraph, The Daily Mirror, Brisbane Sun and The Australian.

Farr regularly appears on the political current affairs programs Meet the Press on Network Ten, and ABC TV's Insiders.

Farr also served as President of the Federal Parliamentary Press Gallery until 2005.

References

External links
The Punch Profile
ABC online profile

Living people
Australian political journalists
1951 births